The domain name tokyo is a top-level domain (TLD) for Tokyo in the Domain Name System of the Internet. On November 13, 2013, ICANN and GMO Registry entered into a registry agreement under which GMO Registry operates the  TLD.

See also
.jp

References

External links

IANA  whois information
 whois

Computer-related introductions in 2014
Internet in Japan
Top-level domains
Domain names of Japan